Ogechi Onyinanya is a Nigerian football goalkeeper. She was part of the Nigeria women's national football team at the 2004 Summer Olympics.

See also
 Nigeria at the 2004 Summer Olympics

References

1985 births
Living people
Nigerian women's footballers
Place of birth missing (living people)
Footballers at the 2004 Summer Olympics
Olympic footballers of Nigeria
Women's association football goalkeepers
Nigeria women's international footballers
Pelican Stars F.C. players